The Turlough Hill Power Station is a pumped storage power station in Ireland, owned and operated by the Electricity Supply Board (ESB).

Like all pumped-storage hydroelectric schemes, it makes use of two water reservoirs connected by a pressure tunnel: in this case an artificial reservoir near the summit of the mountain and the naturally occurring corrie lake, Lough Nahanagan, at the foot of the mountain. Water is pumped up from the lower reservoir to the upper reservoir, using surplus power available at times of low demand, and then allowed to fall by gravity from the upper reservoir back into the lower reservoir, passing through turbines along the way to generate electricity. The power station is designed to generate electricity at times of peak demand and is instantly dispatchable: it can go from standstill to full generation within 70 seconds, compared with 12 hours for some thermal plants. It can generate electricity at full load for up to six hours per day and has a round trip energy efficiency of 75%. Since 2004, Turlough Hill has been the Hydro Control Centre (HCC) for the entire ESB hydroelectric portfolio, which comprises 19 generators in total. An overhaul of the plant was planned for 2011 following the failure of Unit 1's stator bars. A subsequent investigation led to serious defects being discovered, which led to the refurbishment of all four generating units.

History

Turlough Hill was first conceived by Dermot O'Riordan, Deputy Chief Engineer in the ESB's Civil Engineering Department. In 1964, ESB engineers visited several locations in the Wicklow Mountains, digging trial pits and boreholes, looking for suitable sites for a pumped-storage station. A shortlist of three proposals was drawn up by O'Riordan: an artificial upper reservoir at the summit of Tonduff mountain with an artificial lower reservoir in the Glencree valley; an upper reservoir using Lough Ouler, a natural corrie lake near the summit of Tonelagee mountain, with an artificial lower reservoir in the Glenmacnass valley; and an artificial upper reservoir at Turlough Hill with Lough Nahanagan as lower reservoir.

The Turlough Hill site was chosen as the best of these options and work commenced on the scheme in 1968. The cost was estimated at IEP £12 million. A loan of £6 million was secured from the World Bank to partially finance the project. Contracts worth £2 million were signed with Karlstad Mekaniska Werkstad for four reversible pump turbines and with Siemens for four 73 megawatt generators in 1969. The contracts for the civil engineering works were awarded to two German consortia: Beuscher-Teerbau for the upper reservoir and Alfred Kunz & Co. for the underground works in the lower reservoir.

Concerns about the impact of the scheme on the scenery at the Wicklow Gap led to ESB, whose chairman and chief executive at the time, Tom Murray, was an enthusiastic supporter of the project, engaging the services of landscape architect Sylvia Crowe. She recommended that the upper reservoir be camouflaged by planting vegetation on its embankments and that the works on the lower reservoir at Lough Nahanagan be designed to fit into the background of rock. The siting of the transmission lines that would connect Turlough Hill to the electrical grid was a matter of some controversy. Objections to the lines, planned to run from Turlough Hill to the village of Hollywood, came from several quarters, including Bord Fáilte, the Irish tourist board. In the end, it was decided that they would run underground from Turlough Hill for c. , to preserve the view at the Wicklow Gap, before emerging overground on pylons along the King's River to Hollywood. This added £600,000 to the cost of the project.

At their peak, the construction works employed over 500 personnel: many of the workers lived in a temporary camp adjacent to the site, which provided food and lodgings. During the initial exploratory works, a geological fault was discovered inside the mountain and the location of the cavern housing the generating plant had to be altered.  of gelignite were stolen from the site in an armed raid in 1972. Archaeological investigations near the Wicklow Gap during construction uncovered part of Saint Kevin's Road, the ancient path that brought pilgrims from Hollywood to the monastery at Glendalough. The first generator went on line in December 1973 and remaining three soon followed. The scheme became fully operational in 1974. At the time of completion, it was the largest civil engineering project ever carried out in Ireland. The final cost of the project was IEP £22 million.

Following the completion of Turlough Hill, the ESB considered a number of sites – in the Wicklow and Comeragh mountains as well as around Lough Derg – for further pumped-storage schemes. However, Turlough Hill remains the only such scheme in Ireland to date, although the Commission for Energy Regulation has approved the construction of a 70MW facility at Knocknagreenan, County Cork.

Name
The hill originally did not have a name on the Ordnance Survey map. The engineer who identified the site, J O'Riordan, decided to name the hill after his son Turlough. The name is quite fitting in any case as the pumped storage station draws water from the mountain top lake, which thus becomes a ‘dry lake’. There is a geological feature known as a Turlough; it is defined as "(in Ireland) a low-lying area on limestone which becomes flooded in wet weather through the welling up of groundwater from the rock. ORIGIN late 17th cent.: from Irish turloch, from tur ‘dry’ + loch ‘lake’."

See also

 Electricity sector in Ireland
 Spirit of Ireland - A conceptual pumped storage project that may be necessary to facilitate further reliance on wind energy in Ireland

Notes

External links

 Touring the empty reservoir in 1973
 Brochure
 

Energy infrastructure completed in 1974
Buildings and structures in County Wicklow
Hydroelectric power stations in the Republic of Ireland
Pumped-storage hydroelectric power stations
Underground power stations
20th-century architecture in the Republic of Ireland